Christian Müller (born 1 March 1982) is a professional German road bicycle racer.

Wins 

2004
 German ITT Championship, U/23
 European ITT Championship, U/23
2005
 Stage 5, Sachsen Tour
 Stage 5, Tour de l'Avenir

External links 
 

1982 births
Living people
Sportspeople from Erfurt
German male cyclists
People from Bezirk Erfurt
Cyclists from Thuringia
21st-century German people